Erez is a kibbutz in south-western Israel.

Erez may also refer to:

Places 
 Kibbutz Erez
 Erez Crossing, a pedestrian/cargo terminal on the Israeli Gaza Strip barrier
 Neveh Erez, also known as Mitzpe Erez, an Israeli "settlement outpost" in the West Bank
 Erez Industrial Estate, a part of the Valley of Peace initiative
 Historical name of Erzincan

Given name 
 Erez, pseudonym of journalist Aleksander Zederbaum
 Erez Lieberman Aiden (born 1980), American research scientist and mathematician
 Erez Biton (born 1942), Hebrew poet
 Erez Edelstein (born 1961), Israeli basketball coach
 Erez Eisen, an Israeli music producer, part of the electronica music duo Infected Mushroom
 Erez Katz (born 1980), Israeli basketball player
 Erez Markovich (born 1978), Israeli basketball player
 Erez Mesika (born 1979), Israeli professional football (soccer) player
 Erez Shemesh (born 1970), Israeli Olympic competitive sailor
 Erez Tal (born 1961), Israeli announcer and TV presenter

Surname
 Arnon Erez (born 1965), Israeli pianist and chamber musician
 Guy Erez, Israeli–American songwriter and producer
 Kelly Erez, English singer-songwriter

Other uses 
 Erez Battalion, a security examination battalion in the Military Police Corps of the Israeli Defense Forces
 The 2004 Erez Crossing bombing on the Israeli Gaza Strip barrier

See also 
 

Hebrew masculine given names